Jeb Flesch (born February 21, 1969) is a former American football offensive guard who played college football at Clemson University and attended Morrow High School in Morrow, Georgia. He was a consensus All-American in 1991. Flesch was also named first-team All-ACC in 1991. He signed with the Seattle Seahawks in 1992.

References

External links
Fanbase profile

1969 births
Living people
People from Morrow, Georgia
Sportspeople from the Atlanta metropolitan area
Players of American football from Georgia (U.S. state)
American football offensive guards
Clemson Tigers football players
All-American college football players